Sugár is a Hungarian-language surname literally meaning "light ray". Notable people with this surname include:
 (1924-1991), Hungarian painter
 (1882-1936), Hungarian actor and educator
Miklós Sugár (born 1952) Hungarian conductor, music educator, and composer
 Rezső Sugár (1919-1988), Hungarian composer

See also

Sugar (disambiguation)

References

Hungarian-language surnames
Toponymic surnames